"Not the End of the World" is a song by American singer Katy Perry from her sixth studio album Smile (2020). It was written by the singer, Michael Pollack, Madison Love, Jacob Hindlin, and Andrew Goldstein, and was produced by Goldstein and Oscar Görres. "Not the End of the World" is a trap-pop track with an underlying disco beat, sampling a melody from Steam's 1969 song "Na Na Hey Hey Kiss Him Goodbye". Compared to her 2013 single "Dark Horse", the track gained mixed reviews from music critics, who depreciated its message in context to the COVID-19 pandemic.

"Not the End of the World" was promoted as the fourth single from Smile, on December 21, 2020, with an accompanying music video directed by duo Similar But Different. The visual features a group of blue-skinned aliens who accidentally abduct American actress Zooey Deschanel, mistaking her for Perry. The singer performed the single during T Mall Double 11 Gala and on her concert residency Play (2021–22).

Background and composition
"Not the End of the World" was written by Katy Perry, Michael Pollack, Madison Love, Jacob Kasher Hindlin, and Andrew Goldstein. Production has been held by Oscar Görres and Goldstein, which also held the track's instrumentation with keyboards and programming. Musically, it is a trap-pop song with disco beat and is written in the key of D minor. It starts off with the chorus, after which there is a drop. Lyrically, the song talk about how harsh criticism is not the "end of the world". Additionally,  a melody from Steam's 1969 single "Na Na Hey Hey Kiss Him Goodbye" is present in the pre-choruses and during the outro.

Release and reception

"Not the End of the World" was released as the sixth track on Perry's sixth studio album Smile (2020). It was also included on her sixth extended play, Cosmic Energy, released on December 18, 2020. On December 21, 2020 Perry released a music video for the song, making it fourth single of the album. The song's lyrics were described as inappropriate to be released during COVID-19 pandemic. Joe Muggs from i newspaper called the track's "enjoy the ride" narrative to be "out of place". Writing for Insider, Courteney Larocca commented "I understand this song was probably made pre-pandemic, but that still doesn't excuse the decision to release it". 

"Not the End of the World" received mixed reviews from music critics. Lindsay Zoladz of New York Times called the song a "try-hard anthem" with its hooks being "expensively cleared, but none of them click". Commenting on Perry's vocals, Dani Blum from Pitchfork said that the song has her "pseudo-rap" about a "fortune teller and 'flipping off the flop. The Guardians Emily Mackay opined that the track "feels forgettable and anonymous". Vulture.coms Craig Jenkins commented that "Not the End of the World" is one of many songs from Smile which "sell motivational boilerplate, waving away passing clouds but never describing what the storm felt like". Leah Greenblatt from Entertainment Weekly paired the song with its preceding album track "Resilient", saying that they "offer turn-that-frown-upside-down bromides for the mildly depressed". The Independents Helen Brown called "Not the End of the World" one of "low points" of an album. Hannah Mylrea from NME criticized the song for being "radio fodder, adopting trendy production techniques to gloss over a lack of substance". On more positive note, Idolators Mike Wass called "Not the End of the World" a "Smile highlight" Aynslee Darmon from ET Canada said that the song is "perfect track to end 2020".

Writing for PopMatters, Nick Malone said that the song's lyrics "center on nebulous positivity" and that they are "too saccharine to hold any pathos", when he called whole "Not the End of the World" an "overly ambitious sister" of "Dark Horse" (2013). Writing for USA Today, Patrick Ryan called the track a "filler" and "muddy 'Dark Horse' retread" which is full of "empowerment clichés". Callie Ahlgrim of Insider wrote that the song is "supremely tone-deaf", "more formulaic than fun and more radio-thirsty than compelling", and that the interpolation of "Na Na Hey Hey Kiss Him Goodbye" "makes an impact that's more confusing than anything else". Alexa Camp of Slant Magazine stated that the single's success "rests almost entirely on a melody lifted from Steam's 1969 hit 'Na Na Hey Hey Kiss Him Goodbye'" and pointed out similarities to "Dark Horse". Wass was keen of the sample, dubbing it as "addictive".

Promotion

Music video

The "Not the End of the World" music video was directed by duo Similar But Different, and was published on Perry's official YouTube channel on December 21, 2020. Perry announced the release of the video the day before with a two-second snippet of the video. It stars American actress and singer Zooey Deschanel, to whom Perry's appearance has been compared to for years, which gave her the idea for this video during her maternity leave.

In the video, the Earth is set to be destroyed. The clip begins with a scene in which Deschanel reads a newspaper and Perry passes by with baby pram in an Unsub Records cap. Blue-skinned aliens, who are obsessed with the singer, want to abduct her to save her from the planet's destruction. When a toy drops from the carriage, Deschanel picks it up wanting to give it back to Perry, but suddenly she is mistakenly taken by aliens. They think that she is Perry, even though she is unsuccessfully trying to explain to them that she is not. She is teleported to their flying saucer, where she is introduced to the alien's captain, getting dressed in Perry's outfits from earlier eras, including Teenage Dream looks. Additionally, there are references to "Roar", Smile and "California Gurls" outfits can be seen in the background. Deschanel later asks the two aliens who abducted her to help her save the Earth. This is accomplished at the end of the video by unplugging Earth's internet. The video ends with Deschanel wearing a blonde wig, lip syncing the last chorus of the song for a crowd of aliens.

Live performances
Perry performed "Not the End of the World" as a part of medley with "Never Really Over" and "Roar" during T Mall Double 11 Gala in November 2020. Next year, the singer embarked on her first concert residency entitled Play on December 29, 2021, where she included "Not the End of the World" in its set list.

Credits and personnel

 Katy Perry – vocals, songwriting
 Andrew Goldstein – backing vocals, songwriting, production, vocal production, guitar, keyboard, programming, vocal engineering, studio personnel
 Oscar Görres – production, keyboards, programming
 Madison Love – backing vocals, songwriting
 Michael Pollack – backing vocals, songwriting, piano
 Jacob Kasher Hindlin – songwriting
 John Hanes – mixing engineering, studio personnel
 Serban Ghenea – mixing, studio personnel
 Dave Kutch – mastering, studio personnel
 Rachael Findlen – studio personnel
 Ashley Newton – A&R
 Chris Anokute – A&R
 Lauren Glucksman – A&R

References

2020 songs
2020 singles
Katy Perry songs
Songs written by Katy Perry
Songs written by Michael Pollack (musician)
Songs written by Madison Love
Songs written by Jacob Kasher
Songs written by Andrew Goldstein (musician)
Song recordings produced by Oscar Görres
Capitol Records singles
Disco songs